University Hospital Kerry is a public hospital in Quill Street, Tralee, County Kerry, Ireland. It is managed by South/Southwest Hospital Group.

History
The hospital was commissioned to replace the aging St Catherine's Hospital on the north side of Quill Street in Tralee. The new hospital, which was built on a site to the south of the old hospital, opened as the Tralee General Hospital in 1984. After evolving to become Kerry General Hospital, it was renamed University Hospital Kerry in February 2016.

Services
The hospital provides acute services and has 377 beds and delivers nearly 1,500 babies a year. It is affiliated with University College Cork.

References

External links

Hospital buildings completed in 1984
1984 establishments in Ireland
Hospitals in County Kerry
Hospitals established in 1984
Health Service Executive hospitals